Trenna Keating (born January 23, 1987) is a Canadian actress known for her recurring role as Doc Yewll in Defiance between 2013 and 2015.

Early life 
Trenna Keating was born and grew up in Weyburn, Saskatchewan. She likes spending her time hiking and camping outdoors, loves cooking, playing games and dancing. Keating is also a passioned writer of plays. Keating did her BFA degree in acting at the University of Regina.

Career 
When she moved to Toronto, Keating studied clown for a while, and began working as a reader for auditions as her introduction to the Toronto film industry. Keating spent several years working at the theatre and doing crew work in film productions, as background casting director, casting assistant and casting director. On occasion of an interview, she told that most of what I have learned about acting has come from being on the other side of the camera watching actors work.

Keating first appeared in the American romantic comedy and Christmas film Just Friends in 2005, and thenafter in Canadian television series and television films, among them Renegadepress.com, Corner Gas and Combat Hospital in recurring roles. Her probably best known role is the recurring character Doc Yewll in the US-Canadian SciFi-series Defiance that started broadcast in 2013 and was renewed for a third, and last season; Defiance was cancelled by ScyFy on 16 October 2015.

Filmography

References

External links 
 
 

Living people
Canadian film actresses
Canadian television actresses
21st-century Canadian actresses
People from Weyburn
University of Regina alumni
1987 births